Leo Calogero Cusenza (born 20 February 1963) is an English former footballer who played for Football League club Colchester United as a defender. Is now involved coaching local Football for Cuffley Youth FC after having passed his coaching accreditations

Career

Born in Edmonton, London, Cusenza joined Colchester United as a schoolboy. He made one appearance for the first-team in a 2–0 League Cup defeat to Gillingham on 9 August 1980. He went on to nearly 400 appearances for Harlow Town after leaving Colchester. and now coaches in local football in Hertfordshire after attaining his coaching accreditations

References

1963 births
Living people
Footballers from Edmonton, London
English footballers
English people of Italian descent
Association football defenders
Colchester United F.C. players
Harlow Town F.C. players